Jean-Michel Cavalli (born 13 July 1957) is a French and Corsican football manager, who most recently managed MC Oran, and former player.

Biography
Cavalli started his playing career at Gazélec Ajaccio in 1971, also turning out for Corsican sides Bastia SCB (1977–78) and Solenzara (1978–79) before a second spell at Gazélec.

He has managed clubs in Saudi Arabia, France and Morocco, while he took charge of Algeria in 2005. Cavalli coached the Corsica national football team, not affiliated with FIFA or UEFA, in a 2009 friendly against Congo.

References

External links

1957 births
Living people
Association football midfielders
French footballers
French football managers
Algeria national football team managers
French sportspeople of Italian descent
Lille OSC managers
US Créteil-Lusitanos managers
Nîmes Olympique managers
Gazélec Ajaccio managers
Ionikos F.C. managers
Ligue 1 managers
Expatriate football managers in Saudi Arabia
Expatriate football managers in Algeria
Expatriate football managers in Morocco
Expatriate football managers in Sudan
Expatriate football managers in Egypt
Gazélec Ajaccio players
Al-Riyadh SC managers
Wydad AC managers
Al Nassr FC managers
Racing Club de France Football managers
MC Oran managers
Al Hilal SFC managers
Al Ittihad Alexandria Club managers
Footballers from Corsica
Sportspeople from Ajaccio
Botola managers